"Tonite's tha Night" is a song by American rap duo Kris Kross, released as the first single from their third and final album, Young, Rich & Dangerous (1996). It features background vocals from Trey Lorenz and has a remix that features Redman. The single was certified gold on January 17, 1996.

History
The song was a success for the duo, making it to No. 12 on the Billboard Hot 100, No. 1 on the Hot Rap Singles, and No. 17 Rhythmic Top 40. "Tonite's tha Night" marked the fourth single for Kris Kross, after "Jump", "Warm It Up" and "Alright" to make it to No. 1 on the Hot Rap Singles. A remix was also released featuring Redman, however it did not reach any Billboard charts. The song was written and produced by Jermaine Dupri. The song contains a sample from "Riding High" by Faze-O also used by EPMD on "Please Listen To My Demo" on Unfinished Business (EPMD album) and Ghostface Killah on the song "Killa Lipstick" from The Big Doe Rehab album .

Critical reception
Gil L. Robertson IV from Cash Box wrote, "This duo is back and they’re giving up a heavy dose of the urban vibe on this slow jam, which should allow them to recapture the momentum that fell off with their last release. Expect urban formats across the board to support them on their comeback."

Track listing
 A-side
"Tonite's tha Night" (LP version)- 3:19 
"Tonite's tha Night" feat. Redman (remix)- 3:22 
"Da Streets Ain't Right" feat. Da Brat (LP Version)- 3:00

 B-side
"Tonite's tha Night" (remix instrumental)- 3:18 
"Tonite's tha Night" (clean LP version)- 3:19 
"Da Streets Ain't Right" (instrumental)- 3:00

Charts

Weekly charts

Year-end charts

Certifications

References

1995 singles
Kris Kross songs
Songs written by Jermaine Dupri
Song recordings produced by Jermaine Dupri
1995 songs
So So Def Recordings singles